The 84th Texas Legislature began on January 13, 2015. All members of the House and Senate were elected in the general election held on November 4, 2014.

Party summary

Senate

House of Representatives

Officers

Senate
 Lieutenant Governor: Dan Patrick (R)
 President Pro Tempore: Juan Hinojosa (D)

House of Representatives
 Speaker of the House: Joe Straus (R)
 Speaker Pro Tempore: Dennis Bonnen (R)

Members

Senate

-Jose Menendez was sworn in on March 4, 2015 after a special election runoff on February 17, 2015 to serve the remaining term of Leticia Van de Putte. A special election was held March 31, 2015 after Jose Menendez was sworn in.

House of Representatives

- On February 16, 2015 John Lujan is sworn in for the 118th House district after winning the special election and the special election runoff for Joe Faris's seat.

- Leighton Schubert was sworn in on March 3, 2015 in the 13th House district after a special election was held on February 17, 2015 to finish Lois Kolkhorst's term when she was sworn in for Texas's 18th Senate district.

- John Cyrier was sworn in on March 3, 2015 in the 17th House district after a special runoff election was held on February 17, 2015 to fill the vacancy of Tim Kleinschmidt when he resigned a day after he was sworn in.

- On April 30, 2015 Ina Minjarez was sworn into the 124th House district to succeed Jose Menendez after he got elected to Texas's 26th Senate district

- On August 10, 2015 Joe Faris Resigned from the 118th House district.

-Sylvester Turner resigned from the 139th House district on January 1, 2016 to be sworn in as Mayor for Houston after winning the 2015 election.

- On January 31, 2016 Ruth McClendon resigned from the 120th House district.

- On May 19, 2016 Jarvis Johnson, is sworn in to the 139th House district.

- On August 16, 2016 Laura Thompson sworn in after Ruth McLendon resigned from her seat by winning the special election runoff and the special election ordered by the governor.

Notable legislation
On June 11, 2015, Texas Governor Greg Abbott signed the "Pastor Protection Act" which allows pastors to refuse to marry couples if they feel doing so violates their beliefs. On June 13, 2015, Abbott signed a campus carry bill (SB 11) and an open carry bill (HB 910) into law.

References

External links 

84 Texas Legislature
2015 in Texas
2015 U.S. legislative sessions